St. Francis Cathedral is a Roman Catholic cathedral located in Xi'an,  the capital of Shaanxi Province in China.

It was first constructed in 1716, expanded in 1884, closed in 1966 and reopened in 1980.

The grounds are currently the location for the Yellow River Charity. Founded in December 2005 it was the first soup kitchen for the homeless set up in China.

References 

Xian
Francis